Andreas Rosendal Nyhagen (born 4 November 1998) is a Norwegian football defender who plays for Ull/Kisa.

A youth product of Valdres FK, he played for the senior team from 2015 to 2017. In mid-2017 he transferred to the junior team of Strømsgodset. He made his senior debut in the 2019 Norwegian Football Cup. In the autumn of 2019 he was loaned out to Grorud IL in the 2019 2. divisjon.

In 2020 he was loaned out to Moss FK, but the 2020 2. divisjon was postponed due to the COVID-19 pandemic, and Nyhagen was recalled in June 2020 to bolster the Strømsgodset squad instead. He made his Eliteserien debut in October 2020 against Molde. Released after the 2021 season, he moved to Ull/Kisa.

References

1998 births
Living people
People from Nord-Aurdal
Norwegian footballers
Strømsgodset Toppfotball players
Grorud IL players
Moss FK players
Ullensaker/Kisa IL players
Eliteserien players
Association football defenders
Sportspeople from Innlandet